Armada Township may refer to one of the following places in the United States:

 Armada Township, Michigan
 Armada Township, Buffalo County, Nebraska

Township name disambiguation pages